The San Jerónimo Department (in Spanish, Departamento San Jerónimo) is an administrative subdivision (departamento) of the . It is located in the center-south of the province. It limits with the Paraná River in the east; and from there (going clockwise) with the departments of San Lorenzo and Iriondo (south), Belgrano (southwest), San Martín (west), and Las Colonias and La Capital (north).

The department has over 77,000 inhabitants. Its head town is Coronda (population 17,000). Other cities and towns are Arocena, Barrancas, Bernardo de Irigoyen, Campo Piaggio, Casalegno, Centeno, Desvío Arijón, Díaz, Gaboto, Gálvez, Gessler, Larrechea, Loma Alta, López, Maciel, Monje, Pueblo Irigoyen, San Eugenio, San Fabián, San Genaro, and San Genaro Norte.

References
 Inforama - Municipalities of the San Jerónimo Department.
 

Departments of Santa Fe Province